Ațel (Transylvanian Saxon: Hätselderf) is a commune in Sibiu County, Transylvania, Romania. It is composed of two villages, Ațel and Dupuș (Tobsdorf; Táblás). The commune first appears in written history in 1283 as villa Echelini. Later appearances in written documents are villa Heclini (1289), Hetzelini villa and villa Eczlen (1359), Ecczel (1365), and Heczeldorf (1548). A church is mentioned as of 1380.

Demographics 

Population number (grouped by ethnicity) from 1850 to 2011:

Local architecture 

The local medieval Evangelical Lutheran fortified church of Ațel was built by the native Transylvanian Saxon community and completed by the end of the 15th century; it is surrounded by double walls. Above the entrance rises the Old School tower, and close by is the Oat Tower. The fortified church of Dupuș was also built during the 15th century.

Notes

References

 Edroiu, Nicolae, Comuna Ațel : Studiu monografic complex, Editura Eurodidact, 2002 
 Augustin Ioan, Hanna Derer. The Fortified Churches of the Transylvanian Saxons. Noi Media Print, 2004

External links
 Information and photographs

Communes in Sibiu County
Localities in Transylvania